Red Fish is an album by the Northern Irish rock band The Moondogs, released in 2003.

Track listing
"Getting off in Amsterdam" 
"How can I tell her?" 
"So beautiful"
"Bring on the sunshine"
"It feels so good" 
"Oh no not so hard!"
"You wont find her"
"I am changing my life"
"A brighter world"
"I only called in to say Hi!"
"The boy who used to sing" 
"EGO"

The Moondogs albums
2003 albums